The 1966 Whitewater State Warhawks football team represented Wisconsin State University—Whitewater—now known as the University of Wisconsin–Whitewater—as a member of the Wisconsin State University Conference (WSUC) during the 1966 NAIA football season. Led by 11th-year head coach Forrest Perkins, the Warhawks compiled an overall record of 10–1 with a conference mark of 8–0, winning the WSUC title.

Schedule

References

Whitewater State
Wisconsin–Whitewater Warhawks football seasons
Whitewater State Warhawks football